Giampietro Pontiggia (7 April 1927 – 15 February 2023), pen name Giampiero Neri, was an Italian poet. He was noted for his novel style; his work is known for its concise, dry, and unembellished style, and veined with melancholy and humor. His work was often written in prose.

Biography 
Neri was born in Erba, Como on 7 April 1927. He grew up during World War II, in which he lost members of his family. His younger sister committed suicide in her twenties. He began publishing poetry in the 1960s, influenced by his younger brother (but more known at that time) - Giuseppe Pontiggia. He was soon recognized as a major exponent of the Milanese school of poetry. His poems were often themed around the experiences during the war. He was one of the first in Italy to use a poetical prose as poetry (likely influenced by the descriptive narratives by Vittorio Sereni) and has been called "a master of poetry in Italian prose". In 1948 he moved with his family to Milan, where he continued to work in a bank for forty years before his retirement.
In 2020 he adheres at the Empathic Movement (Empathism) arose in the same year in the South of Italy.
In 2019 he received the Cilento Poetry Prize for his brilliant career.

Neri died on 15 February 2023, at the age of 95.

Selected works
 L'aspetto occidentale del vestito (Guanda: 1976)        
 Liceo (Guanda: 1986)  
 Dallo stesso luogo (Coliseum: 1992)  
 Teatro naturale (Mondadori: 1998)  
 Erbario con figure (LietoColle: 2000)  
 Finale (Dialogolibri: 2002)
 Armi e mestieri (Mondadori: 2004)  
Piano d'erba (Quaderni di Orfeo: 2005) 
Di questi boschi (Quaderni di Orfeo: 2007) 
 Paesaggi inospiti (Mondadori: 2009)  
 Il professor Fumagalli e altre figure (Mondadori: 2012)  
 Via provinciale (Garzanti: 2017)   
Non ci saremmo più rivisti. Antologia personale (Interlinea edizioni: 2018)

Bibliography 
 Daniela Marcheschi, La natura e la storia. Quattro scritti per Giampiero Neri (Le Lettere: 2002)    
 Vincenzo Pezzella (edited by), Giampiero Neri. Poesie e immagini (Viennepierre: 2005)
 Pietro Berra, Giampiero Neri. Il poeta architettonico (Dialogolibri: 2005)
 Victoria Surliuga, Uno sguardo sulla realtà. La poesia di Giampiero Neri (Joker: 2005)  
 Elisabetta Motta "Degli animali. Viaggio nel bestiario di Giampiero Neri (Cartacanta: 2018) 
Enzo Rega, in Dizionario critico della poesia italiana 1945-2020 (Società Editrice Fiorentina: 2021)

Further reading 

English translation of poems

External links 
 Giampiero Neri on "New Manifesto of Arts" at the Accademia di Belle Arti di Brera

References

1927 births
2023 deaths
Italian male poets
21st-century Italian poets
People from Como
20th-century Italian poets
20th-century Italian male writers
21st-century Italian male writers